Ray or Raymond Robinson may refer to:

Politics
Ray Robinson (ATSIC), Australian indigenous leader
A. N. R. Robinson (1926–2014), former president and prime minister of Trinidad and Tobago

Sports
Ray Robinson (Australian cricketer) (1914–1965), Australian cricketer
Sugar Ray Robinson (1921–1989), American boxer
Ray Robinson (cricket writer) (1905–1982), Australian journalist and author
Raymond Robinson (cyclist) (born 1929), South African Olympic cyclist
Ray Robinson (sportsman) (1940–2001), cricket and rugby union player
Ray Robinson (footballer) (1895–1964), English footballer
Ray Robinson (baseball), American baseball player

Others
Ray Robinson (novelist) (born 1971), British novelist, screenwriter and musician.
Ray A. Robinson (1896–1976), United States Marine Corps general
Raymond Robinson (Green Man) (1910–1985), severely disfigured man whose years of nighttime walks made him into a figure of urban legend in western Pennsylvania
Ray Robinson (activist) (1937–1973), African-American civil rights activist and murder victim
Ray Charles (1930–2004), American musician, born Raymond Charles Robinson

Similar spelling
 Rey Robinson (born 1952), American former sprinter